The Swiss Market Index (SMI) is Switzerland's blue-chip stock market index, which makes it the most followed in the country. It is made up of 20 of the largest and most liquid Swiss Performance Index (SPI) stocks. As a price index, the SMI is not adjusted for dividends.

The SMI was introduced on 30 June 1988 at a baseline value of 1,500 points. It closed above the symbolic level of 10,000 points for the first time on 2 July 2019. It reached the 12,000 point milestone on 17 June 2021. It is currently in a bear market, which it entered on 22 September 2022 after losing more than 20%. This ended the bull market that had reached an all-time record closing price short of 13,000 on 28 December 2021.

Its composition is examined once a year. As of September 2022, it contains 18 large-caps and two mid-caps. Calculation takes place in real-time. As soon as a new transaction occurs in a security contained in the SMI, an updated index level is calculated and displayed. However, the index is updated no more than once per second. The SMI is calculated in Swiss Francs, the currency of the Swiss Confederation.

The securities contained in the SMI currently represent approximately 70% of the free-float Swiss equity market capitalization, as well as 85% to 90% of the total trading turnover of Swiss and Liechtenstein equities listed on the SIX Swiss Exchange. Because the SMI is considered to be a mirror of the overall Swiss stock market, it is used as the benchmark for numerous mutual funds, index funds and ETFs, and as the underlying index for numerous derivative financial instruments such as options, futures and structured products.

In 2020, the SMI, along with other SIX indices, was endorsed under the EU Benchmarks Regulation and is registered with the European Securities and Markets Authority, which means that it can be used as an underlying for financial products sold in the EU.

Rules

Acceptance criteria
The underlying universe of the SMI, from which candidate constituents are selected, is the SPI. To be accepted into the SMI, a given issue must meet stringent requirements with regard to liquidity and market capitalization. On the one hand, it must represent at least 50% of the average liquidity of the SPI constituent issues. On the other hand, it must have a minimum free-float capitalization equal to 0.45% or more of the entire SPI capitalization. Thus, trading volume and capitalization are the determining factors in the quarterly rankings. The composition of the index is reviewed annually on the third Friday in September.

Fixed number of 20 securities
The SMI comprises a fixed number of 20 securities as of the ordinary review date in September 2007. Prior to this date, the index contained 25 listings.

It is worth noting that the number of constituents of the index (20) is below the generally accepted minimum sample size of 30 required to reach statistical significance.

Capped weightings

In 2017, in order to address the issue that the top three constituents (Nestlé, Roche, Novartis) account for more than 60% of the index capitalization, SIX Swiss Exchange changed the rules of the SMI to introduce capped weighting. The weight of any constituent in the SMI index can no longer exceed 18%.

Readjusting any weight exceeding 18% down to that value is done, in principle, on a quarterly basis. However, whenever a constituent reaches a weight exceeding 20% during a quarter (intra-quarter breach), then the weight is brought back to 18% without waiting for the next quarterly review.

To make the transition smoother, there was an initial transition period during which these changes were progressively implemented, in steps of at most 3% per quarter.

Additionally, a new index, the SPI 20, was created to continue indexing the 20 SMI constituents without any caps.

SMI constituents

Current constituents

As of 16 September 2022, the following 20 stocks make up the SMI index.

The rank is based on free-float capitalization as of 31 August 2022. The first ten weights are given as of 31 August 2022. The other weights are given as of 23 March 2020. The latest update following the ordinary review was implemented on 16 September 2022, when Sonova replaced SGS.

SMI family

SMI is also the name of a family of indices encompassing the SMI itself, but also the SMI MID with the next 30 large-caps (2) and mid-caps (28), and the SMI Expanded with all 50 shares.

The indices are available in several variations. For example, the SMI, which is a price index, also exists as a performance index, the SMI Cum Dividend (SMIC), which takes into account dividend distributions.

History

Historical values
The following table shows the annual development of the Swiss Market Index since 1988.

Milestones 
The following table shows historic milestones of the Swiss Market Index. Latest seen values are not final: italic indicates that the value may be seen again if the bear market persists; parentheses indicate that the value will be seen again if we reenter a bull market (previous peak reached again); Other values may be seen again in case of a crash (assuming a threshold of -50%).

Notes and references 

Swiss stock market indices